BasicX is a free programming language designed specifically for NetMedia's BX-24 microcontroller and based on the BASIC programming language. It is used in the design of robotics projects such as the Robodyssey Systems Mouse robot.

Further reading
Odom, Chris D. BasicX and Robotics. Robodyssey Systems LLC,

External links
NetMedia Home Page
BasicX Free Downloads
Sample Code 
, programmed in BasicX
Videos, Sample Code, and Tutorials from the author of BasicX and Robotics

BASIC compilers
Embedded systems